Gabrielyan is an Armenian surname. In Western Armenian it appears as Kaprielian (Գաբրիելեան) and less often as Gabrielian (Կապրիելեան). It may refer to:

People

Gabrielyan
Arpi Gabrielyan (born 1989),  Armenian broadcaster, singer and actress
Emil Gabrielian (1931–2010), Armenian physician and academician
Vache Gabrielyan (born 1968), Armenian economist

Gabrielian
Eleonora Gabrielian (born 1929), Armenian-born Soviet botanist, doctor of biological sciences, professor
Emil Gabrielian (1931–2010), Armenian physician and academician
Artur Gabrielian (born 1982), Armenian Russian chess grandmaster

Kaprielian
Al Kaprielian, American meteorologist
James Kaprielian (born 1994), American professional baseball player
Rachel Kaprielian (born 1968), American politician, member of the Massachusetts House of Representatives

Kaprelian
Tamar Kaprelian (born 1986), Armenian-American singer, songwriter

Ter-Gabrielyan
Avet Ter-Gabrielyan (1899–1983), Soviet Armenian violinist
Sahak Ter-Gabrielyan (1886–1937), Soviet Armenian statesman and politician

See also
Gabrielyan's prickly thrift or Acantholimon gabrieljaniae, a species of leadwort that is endemic to Armenia. It is found only in the Sevan floristic region

Armenian-language surnames
Patronymic surnames
Surnames from given names